The Caribbean Games  are a multi-sport regional championship event. The games are for countries in the Caribbean, Central American country Belize and South American Caribbean countries Guyana, Suriname, and French Guiana. 

The games are overseen by The Caribbean Association of National Olympic Committees "CANOC"

The first edition of the Caribbean Games was held in Guadeloupe between June 29 to July 3, 2022.

History

Editions

Sports
 Athletics
 Basketball 3x3
 Cycling
 Futsal
 Judo
 Swimming
 Netball

Nations

See also
 Pan American Games
 Commonwealth Games
 Central American and Caribbean Games

References

External links
 2022 Caribbean Games
 CANOC

International sports competitions in the Caribbean
Recurring sporting events established in 2022
Athletics in the Caribbean
Athletics (track and field) competitions in North America
Athletics competitions in the Caribbean
Multi-sport events
Multi-sport events in North America